Ivory Coast competed in the Summer Olympic Games for the first time at the 1964 Summer Olympics in Tokyo, Japan.

Athletics

Men
Track & road events

Field events

Boxing

Men

References

External links
 

Nations at the 1964 Summer Olympics
1964
1964 in Ivory Coast